Frumuşica may refer to:

Romania
 Frumușica, Botoșani, a commune in Botoşani County
 Frumuşica, a village in Mădârjac Commune, Iaşi County

Moldova
 Frumușica, Florești, a commune in Florești District, along with its village of Frumuşica Nouă
 Frumuşica, a village in Băcioi Commune, Chişinău municipality
 Frumuşica, a village in Chioselia Mare Commune, Cahul District
 Frumuşica, a village in Călugăr Commune, Făleşti District
 Frumuşica, a village in Cazangic Commune, Leova District